D.M. Turner (born Joseph Vivian; 5 October 1962 – 31 December 1996) was an author, psychedelic researcher and psychonaut who wrote two books on psychoactive drugs and entheogens. His first book, The Essential Psychedelic Guide, showcased his views on the subjective effects of various psychoactive and hallucinogenic substances. His second book, Salvinorin, addressed the effects of Salvia divinorum. Turner died after injecting an unknown quantity of ketamine while in a bathtub, drowning while presumably incapacitated by the effects of the drug.

Works
 1994: The Essential Psychedelic Guide
 1996: Salvinorin: The Psychedelic Essence of Salvia divinorum

See also
John C. Lilly
Marcia Moore
Alexander Shulgin

References

External links

 D.M. Turner interview with Elizabeth Gips

1962 births
1996 deaths
Deaths by drowning
Psychedelic drug researchers
American psychedelic drug advocates